Anthene alberta is a butterfly in the family Lycaenidae. It is found in the Democratic Republic of Congo (Uele, Ituri and Tanganika), Angola, Uganda, Tanzania, and western Kenya. The habitat consists of primary forests.

References

Butterflies described in 1910
Anthene